Going Back may refer to:

 Going Back (album), a 2010 album by Phil Collins
 Going Back (film), a 1983 film starring Bruce Campbell
 Going Back, aka Under Heavy Fire, a 2001 TV film with Casper Van Dien 
 "Goin' Back", a 1966 song written by Gerry Goffin and Carole King